Sports and Leisure Management Limited (SLM) is a leisure management company that was formed in Hinckley, Leicestershire, United Kingdom in 1987. It trades under the name Everyone Active, which is its consumer brand. At present, the company manages over 200 leisure centres on the behalf of over 50 local authorities and trusts all over England. It provides sports and leisure services to approximately 2.7million members and caters for 3.2million visitors each month.

As a leisure management company, its usual modus operandi is to bid for the rights to managing a wide variety of council-owned leisure properties, including swimming pools, gyms, outdoor athletics centres, outdoor football, hockey and tennis courts and sports halls. Most of its sites, however, have a combination of some or all of these facilities.

History
Founded in 1987 by ex-CEO, Stephen Hulme, Everyone Active’s first centre in Hinckley, Leicestershire, opened in 1988, in partnership with Hinckley and Bosworth Council. Although the company no longer runs that centre, its headquarters are still located in this same Leicestershire town.

Awards
 UKActive Flame Award Leisure Operator of the Year: 2017, 2016, 2012, 2011, 2010
 Swim England/Kelloggs Swimtastic Award (formerly known as ASA award for Facility Operator of the Year): 2017, 2013, 2012, 2009, 2008

Accreditation
 Accredited by Swim England (formerly known as ASA)
 The British Assessment Bureau ISO14001 accredited (Environmental Management)
 The British Assessment Bureau OHSAS18001 accredited (Health and Safety Management)
 Investors in People accredited - Standard for Better People Management
 Employer Partner of CIMSPA - Chartered Institute for the Management of Sport and Physical Activity
 Accredited partner of CHAS contractors Health & Safety Assessment Scheme

Swimming
Of its 200-plus centres, the majority have at least one swimming pool, all of which host Swim England-accredited and award-winning swimming lessons. Alongside the lessons, its pools also provide sessions for fitness swimming, fun swimming, inflatables and aqua aerobics sessions.

Fitness
The company has approximately 128 gyms and fitness suites across its estate of over 160 centres, which include a variety of equipment, such as cardiovascular and weight-training apparatus. Customers can work out independently, as part of an instructor-led small group, or with a personal trainer of their own.

Everyone Active also runs group exercise classes in around 120 of its centres.

Activities
Many of Everyone Active’s centres also include sports halls, squash courts, tennis courts, climbing walls and outdoor football pitches – both artificial and grass – while some centres even include athletic facilities, ski slopes and a velodrome. All of these facilities are available to hire to the company’s members and members of the general public on a pay-as-you-go basis for them to enjoy their favourite activities.

Sporting Champions
Everyone Active’s Sporting Champions programme gives sponsorship opportunities to aspiring elite-level athletes in the UK. Participating athletes are offered different tiers  of support – Gold, Silver and Bronze – according to their level. 

Bronze level athletes are awarded free membership to Everyone Active centres across the country, while Silver athletes receive this, as well as between £200 and £1,000 worth of funding that the athletes can spend on whatever they so choose to further their careers. Lastly, athletes with Gold level sponsorship also get the full membership and access to all 160+ centres across the country, as well as between £1,000 and £5,000 worth of funding.

The programme includes some big-name athletes, such as Alex Danson MBE, part of the Team GB women’s hockey team that won gold at the Rio 2016 Summer Olympics, and multiple Olympic gold medallist gymnast Max Whitlock. There’s also Brinn Bevan, part of Team GB’s artistic gymnastics men’s squad at Rio 2016 and 2015 World silver medallist, alongside wheelchair racer Jade Jones, one of Britain’s most promising Paralympians. She broke the 1500m British record in 2017, won bronze at the 2014 Commonwealth Games and won medals in both the 800m and 1500m at the 2014 European Championships.

The scheme also includes more experienced athletes that are on hand to help guide the next generation of British talent. These include hurdling legend, former world record holder and Olympic medallist Colin Jackson, as well as former Olympic and Commonwealth swimming medallist Steve Parry.

Everyone Health
Everyone Health is the public health arm of Sports and Leisure Management. It provides health services – such as weight loss, mental health support and smoking cessation – on behalf of local authorities all over the country.

Everyone Events
This branch of the company helps clients to organise a wide variety of events to be hosted at the company’s centres all over the country. Events include everything from weddings to boxing matches and everything in between. Many sites offer catering and bar facilities for celebratory occasions, while they are also popular for corporate events.

External links
 Everyone Active
 Everyone Events
 Everyone Active Sporting Champions
 Everyone Health

References

Health clubs in the United Kingdom